

Karte is a town and a locality in the Australian state of South Australia located in the state’s east about  east of the state capital of Adelaide, about  north-west of the municipal seat of Pinnaroo and about  north-east of the town of Lameroo.

The government town of Karte was proclaimed on 8 June 1916 on land in the cadastral unit of the Hundred of Kingsford to the immediate north-west of the Karte Railway Station.  The town was named after the railway station which was a stop on the now-closed Peebinga railway line and whose name is derived from an aboriginal word mean “a low thick scrub.”  The boundaries for the locality were created on 12 August 1999 and includes the site of the government town of Karte which is located in its south-west immediately north of the Karte Conservation Park.

Land use within the locality is mainly concerned with “primary production” while some land in its south-west and north is occupied respectively by the Karte and Peebinga Conservation Parks and is zoned for “conservation”.

The 2016 Australian census which was conducted in August 2016 reports that Karte had a population of 27.

Karte is located within the federal division of Barker, the state electoral district of Hammond and the local government area of the Southern Mallee District Council.

References

Towns in South Australia